Brooke Maree Halliday (born 30 October 1995) is a New Zealand cricketer who currently plays for Northern Districts and New Zealand. In February 2021, after having played nine seasons for Northern Districts, and in the middle of a breakthrough season as one of the top-scoring batswomen in the country, Halliday earned her maiden call-up to the New Zealand squad, for their Women's One Day International (WODI) matches against England. As part of the preparation for the series, she played in a warm-up match for the New Zealand XI Women's team, scoring 79 runs from 56 balls. She made her WODI debut for New Zealand, against England, on 23 February 2021.

On 1 March 2021, Halliday was added to New Zealand's Women's Twenty20 International (WT20I) squad, also for the matches against England. The following day, Halliday was one of the three nominees for the Women's Player of the Month in the ICC Player of the Month Awards. She made her WT20I debut for New Zealand, against England, on 3 March 2021. In May 2021, Halliday was awarded with her first central contract from New Zealand Cricket ahead of the 2021–22 season. In February 2022, she was named in New Zealand's team for the 2022 Women's Cricket World Cup in New Zealand. In June 2022, Halliday was named in New Zealand's team for the cricket tournament at the 2022 Commonwealth Games in Birmingham, England.

References

External links

1995 births
Living people
New Zealand women cricketers
New Zealand women One Day International cricketers
New Zealand women Twenty20 International cricketers
Cricketers from Hamilton, New Zealand
Northern Districts women cricketers
Cricketers at the 2022 Commonwealth Games
Commonwealth Games bronze medallists for New Zealand
Commonwealth Games medallists in cricket
Medallists at the 2022 Commonwealth Games